The South Carolina Mr. Football Award is an honor given to the top high school football player in the state of South Carolina. Past winners have often proceeded to have successful college careers and even play in the National Football League (NFL).

Award winners
Professional teams listed are teams known.

**baseball only. After one season of Tiger baseball, Mounce transferred to Charleston Southern to play football.

References

External links

List of past South Carolina Mr. Football winners 

High school football in South Carolina
Mr. Football awards
1991 establishments in South Carolina